Sherman S. Winn (February 18, 1923 – June 2, 2008) was an American politician. He served as a Democratic member for the 105th district of the Florida House of Representatives. Winn also served as a member for the 34th district of the Florida Senate.

Born in Brooklyn, New York. Winn served in the United States Army during World War II. He lived in Miami-Dade County, Florida for which Winn was elected as the mayor of North Miami, Florida, being considered as the first mayor from 1965 to 1969. In 1970, he won the election for the 105th district of the Florida House of Representatives. Winn succeeded politician, Bob Graham. In 1972, he was succeeded by Joe Lang Kershaw for the 105th district, in which he then served as a member of the Florida Senate for the 34th district from 1972 to 1981.

After being succeeded by Joe Gersten, Winn served for the Government of Miami-Dade County for eleven years. He also served as the vice chairperson of the United States Senate Committee on Commerce, Science, and Transportation for eight years, in which Winn also served for the Senator Executive Business Committee as the chairperson for two years. In 1983, he was honored by the Florida State Legislature, being honored with a bridge having the name "Sherman S. Winn Bridge" in Sunny Isles Beach, Florida. Winn was honored with awards and items being named after him.

Winn died in June 2009 of a brain tumor, at the age of 85.

References 

1923 births
2008 deaths
People from Brooklyn
Deaths from brain tumor
Neurological disease deaths in the United States
Democratic Party Florida state senators
Democratic Party members of the Florida House of Representatives
20th-century American politicians
Mayors of places in Florida